Lifeline  is the Federal Communications Commission's program, established in 1985, intended to make communications services more affordable for low-income consumers. Lifeline provides subscribers a discount on monthly telephone service purchased from participating providers in the marketplace. Subscribers can also purchase discounted broadband from participating providers.

Overview 
Lifeline provides a discount on monthly service of $9.25 per month for eligible low-income subscribers. Subscribers may receive a Lifeline discount on either a wireline or a wireless service, but may not receive a discount on both services at the same time. Lifeline also supports broadband and broadband-voice bundles. FCC rules prohibit more than one Lifeline service per household.

Lifeline is available to eligible low-income subscribers in every state, territory, commonwealth, and on tribal lands.

To participate in the program, subscribers must either have an income that is at or below 135% of the federal poverty guidelines, or participate in certain assistance programs.
In April 2019, the FCC office of Inspector General issued an advisory alert to carriers and beneficiaries in connection to fraudulent enrollment practices.

History 
The FCC established the Lifeline program in 1984 during the Ronald Reagan Administration to provide qualified individuals with discounts on phone service. In 1997, the FCC broadened the scope of the program under the 1997 Universal Service Order to make Lifeline more affordable for low-income households by raising the federal support amount. Due to the rise of cell phones, the FCC made more changes in 2005 (under the George W. Bush Administration) so that wireless phone service providers could offer free cell phone service using Lifeline benefits.

Lifeline has been controversial due to rampant fraud and abuse of the program. On January 31, 2012, the FCC ordered a Lifeline Reform Order to require that Lifeline subscribers show documentation about their income. This change led to savings of over $213 million in 2012.

The FCC under Ajit Pai opened an inquiry in 2017 about excluding wireless resellers, eliminating support of standalone broadband service, and capping the budget of Lifeline. Critics say that these changes would leave millions of poor Americans without phone service. They also say that although 74% of Lifeline subscribers have access to broadband on their smartphone or computer, it is critical to also provide access to standalone broadband service in their homes due to data caps and the usability differences between smartphones and computers.

In August 2019, FCC Chairman Pai proposed further administrative changes to root out fraud and abuse of the program. The biggest change in this proposal is to put in additional requirements to ensure that carriers enrolling subscribers can verify that the person is still living. This change will also prohibit carriers from paying commissions to employees or agencies based on the number of customers they enroll. As of August 2019, Pai's latest Lifeline proposal had not been made public, but the FCC said that the lifeline identity verifier would be rolled out in the US by the end of 2019.

The Lifeline National Eligibility Verifier (National Verifier) is a centralized system that determines whether subscribers are eligible for Lifeline. USAC manages the National Verifier and its customer service department, the Lifeline Support Center.
During the National Verifier soft launch period, service providers will receive access to the National Verifier pre-production (test) environment to test out the system functionalities with mock data. At soft launch, service providers may help consumers apply to the Lifeline Program through the National Verifier service provider portal or by mail.
At the National Verifier full (hard) launch, service providers must use the National Verifier when helping consumers apply to the Lifeline Program. Consumers may also apply to the Lifeline Program on their own, through the National Verifier consumer portal or by mail.
Please note that any NLAD Dispute Resolution request sent two business days before full (hard) launch will be rejected. If an NLAD transaction requires a dispute resolution within this window, it will need to be performed on or after full (hard) launch.

References 

Telecommunications in the United States
Federal Communications Commission